In God's Hands may refer to:

In God's Hands (film), a 1998 film directed by Zalman King.
"In God's Hands" (song), a single by Nelly Furtado from her 2006 album Loose.